Chuyunchi-Nikolayevka (Suyınsı-Nikolayevka) is a rural locality (a selo) in Chuyunchinsky Selsoviet, Davlekanovsky District, Bashkortostan, Russia. The population was 558 as of 2010. There are 7 streets.

Geography 
Chuyunchi-Nikolayevka is located 35 km southeast of Davlekanovo (the district's administrative centre) by road. Chuyunchi is the nearest rural locality.

References 

Rural localities in Davlekanovsky District